Branden Henry Pinder (born January 26, 1989) is an American former professional baseball pitcher. He played in Major League Baseball for the New York Yankees in 2015 and 2016.

Career

Amateur and Minors
Pinder played college baseball at Santa Ana College and Long Beach State University. He was drafted by the New York Yankees in the 16th round of the 2011 Major League Baseball Draft. He made his professional debut for the Staten Island Yankees that season. In 31 innings over 24 games, he was 2–2 with a 1.16 earned run average (ERA), 14 saves and 38 strikeouts. Pinder played 2012 with the Tampa Yankees and pitched in one game for the Trenton Thunder. He was 2–6 with a 2.74 ERA, nine saves and 67 strikeouts in 69 innings. He played the 2013 season with Tampa and Trenton. He had a 2–3 record, 4.42 ERA, six saves and 72 strikeouts in  innings. Pinder started the 2014 season back with Trenton. After recording a 0.56 ERA through 16 innings to start the season, he was promoted to the Scranton/Wilkes-Barre RailRiders.

New York Yankees
On April 15, 2015, Pinder made his major league debut against the Baltimore Orioles, going one inning and allowing one hit in a 7-5 loss. He was optioned to Triple-A on April 21 in exchange for Chasen Shreve. He was recalled on May 9 after Chris Martin was placed on the disabled list. He was sent back down on May 24 to make room for Jacob Lindgren. On June 19, Pinder was called up yet again after Martin was optioned to triple-A. On August 30, Pinder collected his first major league hit, an RBI double, off Atlanta Braves pitcher Jake Brigham. It would be the only at-bat of his career, giving him a career batting average of 1.000. He finished the 2015 season by making 25 relief appearances with an 0-2 record and a 2.93 ERA.

On April 22, 2016, Pinder was placed on the 15-day disabled list due to a right elbow strain. The next day on April 23, an MRI revealed that there was a partially torn UCL in the right elbow. After seeking a second opinion with Dr. James Andrews, Pinder decided to forgo the rest of the 2016 season as he chose to have Tommy John surgery. On November 8, Pinder was designated for assignment. On July 21, 2017, he was released from the Yankees organization.

Los Angeles Angels
The Los Angeles Angels signed Pinder on August 4, 2017. He was released on June 18, 2018.

Long Island Ducks
On June 25, 2018, Pinder signed with the Long Island Ducks of the Atlantic League of Professional Baseball. He announced his retirement on July 23, 2018.

References

External links 

Long Beach State 49ers bio

1989 births
Living people
Sportspeople from Corona, California
Baseball players from California
Major League Baseball pitchers
New York Yankees players
Santa Ana Dons baseball players
Long Beach State Dirtbags baseball players
Long Island Ducks players
Staten Island Yankees players
Tampa Yankees players
Trenton Thunder players
Scranton/Wilkes-Barre RailRiders players